Alice is an unincorporated community in Linn County, in the U.S. state of Iowa.

History
 The Alice post office was established in 1892.

The community's population was 16 in 1900, and 35 in 1920. The community's population declined to 5 in 1940.

The Alice post office was discontinued in 1902.

References

Unincorporated communities in Linn County, Iowa
Unincorporated communities in Iowa